Bernd Behr (born 1976) is a Taiwanese artist based in London.

Biography
Born in Hamburg in 1976 and raised in Malaysia, Behr studied at San José State University, California and Goldsmiths, University of London, London.

Behr was shortlisted for the 2003 Beck's Futures prize at the Institute of Contemporary Arts, London. His work can be seen as a cultural archaeology of sites and events which share confluent histories of art, cinema and the built environment. He works across video, photography and sculpture to explore a dialogue between documentary and constructed approaches to his subjects and the associative, sometimes fictional, histories that emerge from them.

Behr currently teaches on the BA (Hons) Photography course at Camberwell College of Arts, University of the Arts London.

Selected exhibitions and screenings

References

External links
 Website of Bernd Behr
 Circa magazine
 Curating Discourse
 Frieze magazine
 no.w.here
 Time Out London
 Vertigo magazine

1976 births
Living people
Alumni of Goldsmiths, University of London
San Jose State University alumni
Academics of the University of the Arts London